Khanki Headworks is a headworks situated on the River Chenab in Gujranwala District of the Punjab province of Pakistan. The construction of this headworks was completed in 1889 and was one of the oldest headworks in Pakistan.

Khanki headworks is also used to divert water to the Lower Chenab Canal, which originates from Khanki Headworks. Khanki controls water distribution over 3 million acres (12,000 km2) of agricultural lands by one main distributary, the Lower Chenab Canal, and 59 minor distributaries.

History

The old "Head Khanki Barrage" was built from 1892 to 1898 on Chenab River by the British to convert 3 million acres of barren land into cotton and wheat fields. The barrage was built 16-km downstream of Alexandra Railway Bridge with stone and rubble masonry with a maximum capacity of 800,000 cusecs. The Lower Chenab Canal originates from the Barrage carrying about 11,600 cusecs of water. The weir originally was a shuttered type weir comprising 8 spans of 500 ft each and was first one in Punjab which was built upon alluvial soil. The weir got repeatedly damaged in portions and had to be remodeled extensively during 1919-1920 and 1933–1935. Over the time the structure showed some serious engineering defects so after detailed analysis and research, it was decided to build the whole barrage anew and demolish the previous one.The then Member of the National Assembly NA-101 Justice Iftikhar Ahmed Cheema gave the idea of rebuilding the whole project for the betterment of farmers.The construction of new Khanki Barrage was completed in August 2017 but the barrage was formally handed over to the Punjab Irrigation Department in June 2019. The new Khanki barrage construction project cost Rs. 21.3 billion with 87 percent of the funding provided by the Asian Development Bank. New Khanki Barrage will divert 11,653 cusecs of sustainable irrigation supplies to the downstream Lower Chenab Canal. The irrigation distribution system has already been remodeled for additional flows.

The barrage will ensure sustainable irrigation of 3.03 million acres of fertile land in eight districts of central Punjab - Gujranwala, Hafizabad, Sheikhupura, Nankana Sahid, Faisalabad, Jhang, Chiniot and Toba Tek Singh. The project will benefit about 568,000 farming families and reduce flooding risks from once in 50 years to once in 100 years.

Flooding hazards
Chenab River passes through Marala Headworks, Khanki Headworks, Qadirabad Headworks and Trimmu Barrage and there is river flooding hazards every year during the flooding season in all five major rivers of the old Punjab of British India on both sides of the border of India and Pakistan. Both countries monitor and watch the river water flow levels in their areas – especially closely during the flooding season.

See also
 List of barrages and headworks in Pakistan
 List of dams and reservoirs in Pakistan
Punjab Irrigation Department

References

Gujranwala District
Dams on the Chenab River
Dams in Pakistan
1892 establishments in British India